Vidal Sassoon International Center for the Study of Antisemitism (SICSA) is a research center affiliated with the Hebrew University of Jerusalem. It was named for Vidal Sassoon, who financed its establishment in 1983.

The Vidal Sassoon center is as an interdisciplinary research center devoted to the independent, non-political accumulation and dissemination of materials related to antisemitism.  The director is Prof. Manuela Consonni who replaced Robert Wistrich after his death in 2015. 

Over 120 studies have been conducted under the auspices of the center, covering a wide range of disciplines — history, psychology, sociology, anthropology, literature and art. The center awards Felix Posen Fellowships  to doctoral candidates whose dissertation focuses on some aspect of antisemitism.

Publications
The center has produced numerous publications, including book-length studies, collections of papers presented at conferences, occasional papers, and a journal.

The ACTA series is an annual report from a special SICSA research unit that provides in-depth analysis of current trends in antisemitism and explores the influence of anti-Jewish and anti-Zionist ideology on public opinion, and the arts, mass media, and political movements. Papers in this series are available in print and online.

As a supplement to the ACTA series, the Posen Papers aim to provide a more rapid response to issues of global antisemitism.  Antisemitism International is a  semi-annual research journal that focuses on topics of current importance.

In 1984, the Center initiated a bibliographic project on antisemitism. It comprises the most comprehensive computerized database of works published in most English and most European languages about antisemitism throughout the world in every period, including the events of the Holocaust. Each entry is accompanied by an English abstract.

A massive and increasing number of books and articles have been written on the topic since 1945; whether popular or scholarly, descriptive or interpretative. Prior to the establishment of the bibliographic project these publications were not listed in a way that permitted optimal use of them by scholars and students, as well as to enhance public awareness of the subject.

For the purpose of the bibliography, antisemitism is defined as antagonism toward Jews and Judaism as expressed in writings (i.e. in religious texts, polemical literature, and works of fiction), in the visual arts (i.e. art, caricatures, posters, and film), and in actions (i.e. massacres and pogroms, discriminatory legislation, and the Holocaust).

The online data base is accessible through the Israel University Inter-Library Network and the Center’s website(go to “search the bibliography”). It also appears as a series of printed volumes entitled Antisemitism — An Annotated Bibliography published by K. G. Saur Verlag, Munich, Germany.

Conferences, symposia and lectures

Throughout the academic year, the Center sponsors international conferences on such topics as Demonizing the Other and Antisemitism and Multiculturalism. A number of lectures and presentations from its conferences are available as streaming audio and/or video files on the Center’s website.

Monthly lectures on topics currently researched by scholars supported by or affiliated with the Center are held on the Hebrew University campus.

References

External links 
 SICSA Official Website
 Official Facebook Page
 The Felix Posen Bibliographic Project on Antisemitism
Voices on Antisemitism Interview with Vidal Sassoon from the U.S. Holocaust Memorial Museum

Centers for the study of antisemitism
Education in Jerusalem
Hebrew University of Jerusalem
Israel based opposition to antisemitism